Morell Regional High School, is a Canadian secondary school in Morell,  Prince Edward Island. The school is a part of the Prince Edward Island Department of Education and Lifelong Learning. Morell Regional High School is host to the 2023 Canadian winter games.

See also
List of schools in Prince Edward Island
List of school districts in Prince Edward Island

References 

High schools in Prince Edward Island
Schools in Kings County, Prince Edward Island
Educational institutions in Canada with year of establishment missing